The Hell Gate Bridge, originally the New York Connecting Railroad Bridge or the East River Arch Bridge, is a  steel through arch railroad bridge in New York City. Originally built for four tracks, the bridge currently carries two tracks of Amtrak's Northeast Corridor and one freight track across the Hell Gate, a strait of the East River, between Astoria in Queens and Randalls and Wards Islands in Manhattan.

The arch across the Hell Gate is the largest of three bridges that form the Hell Gate railroad viaduct. An inverted bowstring truss bridge with four  spans crosses the Little Hell Gate, a former strait that is now filled in, and a  fixed truss bridge crosses the Bronx Kill, a strait now narrowed by fill. The designs of the Tyne Bridge in Newcastle, England and the Sydney Harbour Bridge in New South Wales, Australia were derived from the Hell Gate Bridge.

History

The bridge was conceived in the early 1900s to link New York and the Pennsylvania Railroad (PRR) with New England and the New York, New Haven, and Hartford Railroad (NH). As part of the plan, the Hell Gate Bridge would carry four tracks, which would connect to the NH's four-track lines on either side of the Hell Gate.

Fearing that the public assumed that the towers were structurally integral to the bridge, Lindenthal added aesthetic girders between the upper chord of the arch and the towers to make the structure appear more robust. The original plans for the piers on the long approach ramps called for a steel lattice structure. The design was changed to smooth concrete to soothe concerns that asylum inmates on Wards and Randall's islands would climb the piers to escape.

The engineering was so precise that when the last section of the main span was lifted into place, the final adjustment needed to join everything together was just . Construction of the Hell Gate Bridge began on March 1, 1912 and ended on September 30, 1916. The bridge was dedicated and opened to rail traffic on March 9, 1917, with Washington–Boston through trains first running on April 1. It was the world's longest steel arch bridge until the Bayonne Bridge opened in 1931.

During World War II, its economic value made it a target of the Nazi sabotage plan known as Operation Pastorius.

In the 1990s, the bridge was repainted for the first time since it opened. It was painted a deep red called "Hell Gate Red". Due to a flaw in the paint, the red color began to fade before the work was completed, leading to the bridge's currently faded, splotchy appearance.

Design
The bridge could last for at least a millennium, according to the February 2005 issue of Discover magazine. Most other bridges would fall in about 300 years.

Usage

Tracks
The bridge originally carried four tracks, two each for passenger and freight, but one freight track was abandoned in the mid-1970s. At one time, all tracks were electrified with the 11 kV, 25 Hz overhead catenary, the standard of NH and PRR. The passenger tracks have been electrified since 1917, and the freight tracks from 1927 to 1969, using Amtrak's 25 Hz traction power system.

Fares
Some passengers paid to use the bridge; some fares over the bridge were higher than the usual fares for the same mileage. In September 1940, coach fares were two cents per mile, so the trip from Boston to either Grand Central Terminal or New York Penn Station was the same amount, at $4.60, even though only trains to Penn Station used Hell Gate. The trip from Boston to Washington, D.C. was $10.00 instead of the expected $9.10; for a few decades after 1920, 90 cents was added to all fares via Hell Gate except tickets to New York itself. In April 1962, New Haven to New York cost $3.43, New York to Philadelphia cost $3.91, and New Haven to Philadelphia was $8.24. (1962 fares do not include federal tax, then 10 percent.)

Operation
The bridge and structure are owned by Amtrak and lies in the New York Terminal District, part of its Boston to Washington, D.C. electrified main line known as the Northeast Corridor. The bridge's two western tracks are part of the Hell Gate Line and are electrified with 12.5 kV 60 Hz overhead power and are used by Amtrak for Acela Express and Northeast Regional service between New York and Boston. In September 2009, the Metro-North Railroad's Train to the Game services, operated by New Jersey Transit from key stations on the New Haven Line to Secaucus Junction, started using the bridge during every Sunday 1:00 PM Giants or Jets NFL game at MetLife Stadium. This service was suspended in 2017.

The bridge is also part of the New York Connecting Railroad, a rail line that links New York City and Long Island to the North American mainland. The third track forms part of the CSX Fremont Secondary and carries CSX, Canadian Pacific and Providence & Worcester Railroad freight trains between Oak Point Yard in the Bronx and Fresh Pond Yard in Queens, where it connects with the New York and Atlantic Railway.

In September 2009, Metro-North revived its planning efforts for its Penn Station Access project, which would use the Hell Gate Bridge to connect the New Haven Line to Penn Station. Such a service would terminate at Penn Station on platforms freed up by the planned completion of the Long Island Rail Road's East Side Access tunnel to Grand Central Terminal, which is scheduled for completion in late 2022. If the plan is implemented, through-running between the New Haven Line and New Jersey Transit would be possible, linking business centers in Connecticut and New Jersey while providing access to Newark Liberty International Airport. The draft Environmental Assessment was originally expected to be available for public review in late 2018. Subsequently, in January 2019, it was announced that Amtrak and the MTA had reached an agreement regarding track usage rights, and $35 million was approved for initial engineering design work. The MTA was expected to begin service on the line by 2023. This was later delayed to 2027.

See also
 List of bridges documented by the Historic American Engineering Record in New York
 Oak Point Link, connecting rail line in the Bronx
 Rail freight transportation in New York City and Long Island
 Michael Sergio, who wrote Under Hellgate Bridge (2000)

References
Notes

Citations

Further reading

External links
 

1916 establishments in New York City
Amtrak bridges
Astoria, Queens
Bridges completed in 1916
Bridges in Manhattan
Bridges in Queens, New York
Bridges in the Bronx
Historic American Engineering Record in New York City
New York, New Haven and Hartford Railroad bridges
Pennsylvania Railroad bridges
Railroad bridges in New York City
Randalls and Wards Islands
Steel bridges in the United States
Through arch bridges in the United States